This is a chronological list of notable cases decided by the Supreme Court of Canada from Brian Dickson's appointment as Chief Justice on April 18, 1984, to his retirement on June 30, 1990.

1984

19851989

1990

See also
 List of notable Canadian Courts of Appeals cases

 (1984-1990)